The 1972 UCI Track Cycling World Championships were the World Championship for track cycling. They took place in Marseille, France, in 1972. Due to the 1972 Summer Olympics only six events were contested, 4 for men (3 for professionals, 1 for amateurs) and 2 for women.

Medal summary

Medal table

See also
 1972 UCI Road World Championships

References

Track cycling
UCI Track Cycling World Championships by year
International cycle races hosted by France
1972 in track cycling